Lost Branch is a stream in Knox County in the U.S. state of Missouri.

According to tradition, a lost child near the creek accounts for the name.

See also
List of rivers of Missouri

References

Rivers of Knox County, Missouri
Rivers of Missouri